Xavier Brooks Paul Jr. (born February 25, 1985) is an American former professional baseball outfielder. He played in Major League Baseball (MLB) for the Los Angeles Dodgers, Pittsburgh Pirates, Cincinnati Reds and Arizona Diamondbacks.

Early life
While at Slidell High School in 2003 he was selected to Baseball America's second team High School All-American team after batting .391 with nine homers, 17 RBIs and 18 stolen bases. He then hit .444 for Team USA at the 2003 Pan American Games. He also played with the 2001 Junior National Team that won a gold medal at the World Championships. He was named the state of Louisiana 2003 Mr. Baseball.

Baseball career

Los Angeles Dodgers
Paul was drafted in the fourth round of the June 2003 MLB Draft by the Los Angeles Dodgers. He made his professional debut with the Ogden Raptors and was selected to the Rookie League All-Star team after hitting .307 for the Raptors.

In 2004, he was tagged by Baseball America as having the best outfield arm in the Dodgers system and as the Dodgers seventh-best prospect. He hit .262 for the Columbus Catfish that season.

He played for the Vero Beach Dodgers in 2005 and 2006, and was ranked by Baseball America as the Best Defensive outfielder in the entire Single-A level.

In 2007, he played for the Double-A Jacksonville Suns, hitting .291 with 11 homers and 17 stolen bases. Paul was selected to the Southern League Mid-season All-Star Team. He played in the Arizona Fall League after the season and was promoted to the Las Vegas 51s and placed on the Dodgers 40 man roster for the 2008 season. He hit .316 with Las Vegas that season in 115 games.

He began the 2009 season with the AAA Albuquerque Isotopes, and then on May 7, 2009, Paul was called up to the Los Angeles Dodgers  to replace Manny Ramirez, who was suspended for testing positive for performance-enhancing drugs. Paul made his Major League debut the same day, grounding into a double play in his one at bat as a pinch hitter against the Washington Nationals.  His first major league hit was against the San Francisco Giants three days later, and he hit his first home run against the Florida Marlins on May 15.

Shortly afterwards he was sidelined by a staph infection and placed on the disabled list. While rehabbing at the Dodgers complex in Arizona, he then suffered an ankle injury and spent the rest of the year on the 60-day disabled list.

Paul appeared in 44 games with the Dodgers in 2010, thanks to a succession of injuries to Ramirez. He hit .231 over that period before he was returned to the minors. He appeared in 57 games with the Isotopes during the season, hitting .325 in 57 games but a late season injury made him unavailable for a September callup.

He began the season with the Dodgers in 2011 but after he appeared in seven games and had three hits in 11 at-bats, Paul was designated for assignment on April 18, 2011.

Pittsburgh Pirates
On April 26, 2011, he was claimed off waivers by the Pittsburgh Pirates. With the Pirates, he appeared in 121 games, hitting .254 with 16 stolen bases. Paul was designated for assignment on November 18, 2011. The Pirates released Paul on November 28, 2011.

Washington Nationals
On December 20, 2011, he signed a minor league contract that included an invitation to spring training with the Washington Nationals. He was granted his release in July 2012.

Cincinnati Reds
Paul signed a minor league contract with the Cincinnati Reds on July 7, 2012. He was assigned to the Triple-A Louisville Bats. The Reds selected his contract on July 18, 2012. He became a free agent on December 2, 2013 after being non-tendered by the Reds.

Baltimore Orioles
Paul signed a minor league contract with the Baltimore Orioles on in December 2013.

Arizona Diamondbacks
Paul signed a minor league contract with the Arizona Diamondbacks on August 7, 2014. On August 8, his contract was selected from the Triple-A Reno Aces. He was released on August 29.

Philadelphia Phillies
On November 13, 2014, Paul signed a minor league contract with the Philadelphia Phillies.
He was released on March 16.

Delfines del Carmen
On May 6, 2016, Paul signed with the Delfines del Carmen of the Mexican Baseball League. He was released on June 8, 2016.

Texas Rangers
On July 2, 2017, Paul signed a minor league deal with the Texas Rangers. He was released on February 5, 2018.

Southern Maryland Blue Crabs and retirement
On February 14, 2018, Paul signed with the Southern Maryland Blue Crabs of the Atlantic League of Professional Baseball. He was released on May 8, 2018.

Paul retired in the 2018–2019 offseason.

References

External links

1985 births
Living people
Águilas de Mexicali players
Albuquerque Isotopes players
American expatriate baseball players in Mexico
African-American baseball players
Arizona Diamondbacks players
Baseball players from Louisiana
Cajun sportspeople
Cincinnati Reds players
Columbus Catfish players
Delfines de Ciudad del Carmen players
Jacksonville Suns players
Las Vegas 51s players
Los Angeles Dodgers players
Louisville Bats players
Major League Baseball outfielders
Mexican League baseball left fielders
Mexican League baseball right fielders
Norfolk Tides players
North Shore Honu players
People from Slidell, Louisiana
Pittsburgh Pirates players
Reno Aces players
Ogden Raptors players
Southern Maryland Blue Crabs players
Syracuse Chiefs players
Vero Beach Dodgers players
21st-century African-American sportspeople
20th-century African-American people